William Giles and Bill Giles may refer to:
 Bill Giles (American football) (1932–1998), head football coach at Chadron State College Fort Hays State University
 Bill Giles (baseball) (William Yale Giles, born 1934), longtime Philadelphia Phillies executive and part owner
 Bill Giles (meteorologist) (William George Giles, born 1939), meteorologist and television presenter
 William Giles (colonial manager) (1791–1862), CEO of the South Australia Company, 1841–1860, and member of the South Australian colonial legislature
 William Giles (Oz), fictional character on HBO's prison drama Oz, played by Austin Pendleton
 William B. "Buck" Giles (1903–1985), American baseball player
 William Branch Giles (1762–1830), American statesman
 William Fell Giles (1807–1879), U.S. Representative from Maryland
 William Henry Giles Kingston (1814–1880), writer of tales for boys
 William L. Giles (1911–1997), president of Mississippi State University, 1966–1976